Opsarius cocsa is a species of cyprinid fish endemic to India.

References

Opsarius
Fish described in 1822